Brick Lane may refer to:

Brick Lane, a street in the East End of London, England
Brick Lane (novel), a novel by Monica Ali
Brick Lane (2007 film), a British feature film based on Monica Ali's novel
Brick Lane (2006 film), a British documentary directed and produced by Minoo Bhatia